"Kissin' in the Back Row of the Movies" is a song originally recorded by The Drifters in 1974. It was the second of four charting singles released from their Love Games LP. Johnny Moore is the lead singer.

The song reached the Top 10 in the UK, the second of three to do so.  "Kissin' in the Back Row of the Movies" also reached the Top 10 in Australia.

Composition 
Interviewed on BBC Radio 2 in 2022, the song's co-writer Roger Greenaway revealed he had to persuade Johnny Moore to record the song after Moore questioned the appropriateness of a man of his age performing lyrics such as "When I pick her up from school" and "When her homework's done". Greenaway claimed he managed to convince Moore to put his voice to the record by insisting Drifters fans would be unconcerned by the lyrics and that the song would be a hit. After the song was released and reached Number 2 in the UK Singles Chart, Moore admitted he had been wrong to question the song and from that point on referred to Greenaway as "The Doctor".

Chart history

Weekly charts

Year-end charts

References

External links
 

1974 songs
1974 singles
The Drifters songs
Bell Records singles
Songs written by Roger Cook (songwriter)
Songs written by Roger Greenaway